Wind egg or variants may refer to:
Cock egg, an egg without a yolk and/or a shell
Windegg (disambiguation)